Superman was an ongoing comic book series featuring the DC Comics superhero of the same name. The second volume of the previous ongoing Superman title, the series was published from cover dates January 1987 to April 2006, and ran for 228 issues (226 monthly issues and two issues published outside the concurrent numbering). This series was launched after John Byrne revamped the Superman character in 1986 in The Man of Steel limited series, introducing the post-Crisis on Infinite Earths version of the Superman character.

After that limited series, Action Comics returned to publication and Superman vol. 2, #1 was published. The original Superman series (volume 1) became The Adventures of Superman starting with issue #424. Superman vol. 2 continued publishing until April 2006 at which point DC restored The Adventures of Superman to its original title and canceled the second Superman series.

Publication history

Because the DC Universe was revamped after the events of Crisis on Infinite Earths, the previous continuity before that series (colloquially referred to as "pre-Crisis") was voided. Previously established characters were given the opportunity to be reintroduced in new ways. Reintroductions of classic villains were part of the new Superman series' first year, featuring the first post-Crisis appearances of characters such as Metallo and Mister Mxyzptlk and the introduction of Supergirl. The historic engagement of Lois Lane and Clark Kent was one of the major events in the book's run. Writer/artist Dan Jurgens created a supporting hero named Agent Liberty in issue #60 (Oct. 1991). The series participated in such crossover storylines as "Panic in the Sky". The hallmark of the run was the storyline "The Death of Superman". The actual "death" story was published in this series' 75th issue, and would be a major media and pop culture event with the issue going on to sell over three million copies.

As the main series featuring the most prominent character of the DC Universe, the series crossed over with a number of different line-wide crossover stories including Zero Hour: Crisis in Time, The Final Night, and Infinite Crisis.  Superman received a new costume and new superpowers in issue #123 (May 1997).

In 1999, Superman, along with the other three titles, were revamped with Jeph Loeb replacing longtime writer Dan Jurgens.  During Loeb's run on the series he created Imperiex, introduced a Bizarro created by the Joker in the "Emperor Joker" storyline, and also helped with a controversial storyline in which Superman's nemesis, supervillain Lex Luthor, became the President of the United States. Loeb's run on the series included the crossover event Our Worlds at War, which saw the destruction of Topeka, Kansas, serious damage to Clark Kent's nearby hometown of Smallville, and Superman adopting a costume of more somber colors to mourn the heavy loss of life during the event. Loeb's run ended with issue #183 (August 2002).

In 2004–2005, artist Jim Lee, who had recently concluded the Batman: Hush storyline with Loeb, provided the artwork for a Superman story by writer Brian Azzarello. The story, Superman: For Tomorrow, ran for twelve issues and was collected in an Absolute Edition hardcover in May 2009.

With the publication of issue #226 (April 2006),<ref>{{gcdb series|id= 3386|title= Superman vol. 2'}}</ref> the series was canceled as part of the company-wide Infinite Crisis event. The Adventures of Superman was returned to its original title, Superman, with issue #650 the following month.

Annuals
From 1987 to 2000, twelve annual issues of the series were published. The first annual featured a post-Crisis retelling of the first Titano story. Beginning with the second annual, the stories tied into the crossovers or themes that were running through DC's annuals that year. These were:
 Annual #2 (1988) - "Private Lives"
 Annual #3 (1991) - "Armageddon 2001"
 Annual #4 (1992) - "Eclipso: The Darkness Within"
 Annual #5 (1993) - "Bloodlines: Outbreak"
 Annual #6 (1994) - "Elseworlds Annual"
 Annual #7 (1995) - "Year One"
 Annual #8 (1996) - "Legends of the Dead Earth"
 Annual #9 (1997) - "Pulp Heroes"
 Annual #10 (1998) - "Ghosts"
 Annual #11 (1999) - "JLApe: Gorilla Warfare!"
 Annual #12 (2000) - "Planet DC"

Collected editions

Reception
Martin A. Stever reviewed Superman Space Gamer/Fantasy Gamer No. 83. Stever commented that "Byrne has made Superman human enough that we can understand and like him. Thank you John Byrne for making Superman super'' again".

References

External links
 
 Superman vol. 2 at Mike's Amazing World of Comics

1987 comics debuts
2006 comics endings
Comics by Brian Azzarello
Comics by Dan Jurgens
Comics by Jeph Loeb
Comics by Jim Lee
Comics by John Byrne (comics)
Comics by Roger Stern
DC Comics titles
Superhero comics
Superman titles